The women's competition in 69 kg division was staged on September 24, 2007.

Schedule

Medalists

Records

Results

New records

References
Results 

Women's 69
World